Barton Hill railway station was a minor railway station serving the villages of Barton Hill and Barton-le-Willows in North Yorkshire, England. Located on the York to Scarborough Line it was opened on 5 July 1845 by the York and North Midland Railway. It closed on 22 September 1930.
The station was originally just named Barton, but the 'Hill' suffix was added in July 1853.

References

External links
 Barton Hill station on navigable 1947 O. S. map

Disused railway stations in North Yorkshire
Railway stations in Great Britain opened in 1845
Railway stations in Great Britain closed in 1930
Former York and North Midland Railway stations
George Townsend Andrews railway stations